Obrad Belošević (28 April 1928 – 20 January 1986) was a Serbian basketball referee.

Refereeing career 
Belošević refereed over 300 games of the Yugoslav League from 1951 to 1976. Other notable events he refereed in include the 1968 Summer Olympics, 1970 FIBA World Championship, 1974 FIBA World Championship, two European Champions Cup final games (1969 and 1970) and a FIBA Korać Cup final. He was enshrined in the FIBA Hall of Fame in 2007.

Personal life 
Belošević's son, Ilija (born 1972), is considered one of the best European basketball referees.

References

1928 births
1986 deaths
EuroLeague referees
FIBA Hall of Fame inductees
FIBA referees
Sportspeople from Leskovac
Serbian basketball referees